The .43 Egyptian was a copper and brass centerfire cartridge used by the Egyptian Army and France for the No. 1 Remington Military Rifle, a rolling block rifle. Used between 1870 and the end of the First World War, it is closely linked to the .43 Spanish.

History of use

The Egyptian government originally planned to use the Egyptian .43 cartridge in 1868 "as a matter of national prestige" with 60,000 No. 1 Remington rifles order from Remington. Egypt however was initially unable to meet the payments and the rifles and cartridges were sent to France for use during the Franco-Prussian War. The order was eventually completed in 1876.

Distribution was wide in the Middle East and use continued in the civilian population. It was fired at the British Army in the Mahdist War, and production continued towards 1916.

References

Pistol and rifle cartridges
Military cartridges